is an arcade puzzle game developed by Cave and distributed by Jaleco.

Gameplay 

Puzzle Uo Poko is a visual matching game in which one player or two co-operative players (represented by cats) try to clear the screen of coloured bubbles in order to progress to the next level. All the action takes place underwater across 30 stages and with each completed level the cats travel deeper in their submarine.

Development and release 

Puzzle Uo Poko was solely designed by Toshiaki Tomizawa, a co-founder of Cave whose previous works include the DonPachi series.

Puzzle Uo Poko was released in Japanese arcades by Jaleco in February 1998. Unlike several other releases by Cave, Uo Poko remained exclusive to arcades and did not see a contemporary port for a home console. The title has since been re-released on the AntStream service.

Reception 
In Japan, Game Machine listed Puzzle Uo Poko on their April 15, 1998 issue as being the twenty-first most-popular arcade game at the time. Game Hihyō also reviewed the game.

Notes

References

External links 
 

1998 video games
Arcade video games
Arcade-only video games
Cave (company) games
Cooperative video games
Japan-exclusive video games
Jaleco games
Multiplayer and single-player video games
Puzzle video games
Video games developed in Japan